The 1950 Liège–Bastogne–Liège was the 36th edition of the Liège–Bastogne–Liège cycle race and was held on 23 April 1950. The race started and finished in Liège. The race was won by Prosper Depredomme.

General classification

References

1950
1950 in Belgian sport